The Biological Technologies Office (BTO) is one of the seven technical offices within DARPA, an agency of the U.S. Department of Defense that is responsible for the development of advanced technology for national security. BTO was created in 2014 by combining some programs from the Defense Sciences Office (DSO) and the Microsystems Technology Office (MTO). The office focuses on basic and applied research in the areas of gene editing, biotechnologies, neurosciences and synthetic biology — from powered exoskeletons for soldiers to brain implants that can control mental disorders.

DARPA’s embrace of bioscience began in earnest in 2001, when anthrax spores posted to media offices and members of the US Congress brought concerns about bioterrorism to the fore. Then came the wars in Afghanistan and Iraq, which led the agency to invest in fields such as neuroscience, psychology and brain-computer interfaces — all with the intention of helping injured veterans. By 2013, the number of biology-related programmes had grown such that DARPA decided to consolidate them under one roof.

Organization 
The first  BTO office director in 2014-2015 - Dr. Geoffrey Ling, MD.

The current BTO office director is Dr. Bradley Ringeisen, who joined DARPA as BTO’s deputy director in 2015 and was named director in 2019.

Active Programs 
The BTO focused on leveraging advances in engineering and information sciences to drive and reshape biotechnology for technological advantage. BTO is responsible for all neurotechnology, human-machine interface, human performance, infectious disease, and synthetic biology programs within the agency.
 Advanced Plant Technologies (APT)
Atmospheric Water Extraction (AWE)
Autonomous Diagnostics to Enable Prevention and Therapeutics (ADEPT)
 Battlefield Medicine
Bioelectronics for Tissue Regeneration (BETR)
 Biological Control
 Biological Robustness in Complex Settings (BRICS)
Biostasis
Bridging the Gap (BG+)
Detect It with Gene Editing Technologies (DIGET)
 Dialysis-Like Therapeutics (DLT)
 Electrical Prescriptions (ElectRx)
 Engineered Living Materials (ELM)
Epigenetic CHaracterization and Observation (ECHO)
Focused Pharma
Friend or Foe
 Hand Proprioception and Touch Interfaces (HAPTIX)
 In Vivo Nanoplatforms (IVN)
Insect Allies (2017-2021)
 Intelligent Neural Interfaces (INI)
INTERfering and Co-Evolving Prevention and Therapy (INTERCEPT)
 Living Foundries
 Measuring Biological Aptitude (MBA)
Microphysiological Systems (MPS)
 Neural Engineering System Design (NESD)
 Neuro Function, Activity, Structure, and Technology (Neuro-FAST)
Next-Generation Nonsurgical Neurotechnology (N3)
Nucleic acids On-demand Worldwide (NOW)
Panacea
 Pandemic Prevention Platform (P3)
Persistent Aquatic Living Sensors (PALS)
 Personalized Protective Biosystem (PPB)
PReemtive Expression of Protective Alleles and Response Elements (PREPARE)
PREventing EMerging Pathogenetic Threats (PREEMPT)
 Prometheus
 Rapid Threat Assessment
ReSource
 Restoring Active Memory (RAM)
ReVector
 Revolutionizing Prosthetics
 Safe Genes
 Systems-Based Neurotechnology for Emerging Therapies (SUBNETS)
 Targeted Neuroplasticity Training (TNT)
 Technologies for Host Resilience (THoR)

See also
AbCellera

References

External links
 
 Conference "DARPA: Biology Is Technology" (New York, 2015) Playlist
 Conference "DARPA: Biology Is Technology" (San Francisco, 2015) Playlist

DARPA offices
Military units and formations established in 1958
Research and development in the United States
Research projects
United States Department of Defense agencies
1958 establishments in Virginia
Government agencies established in 1958